Nadia Margrét Jamchi is a retired American-born Icelandic figure skater. She is a multiple national medallist including a double Icelandic National Champion, once junior and once senior.

Personal life 

Nadia Margrét Jamchi was born June 22, 1994 in San Diego, California.

After retiring she started a coaching career with her former club, Skautafélag Reykjavíkur. In 2018 she was chosen by the Icelandic Skating Association for a four year Coaching Development Program for coaches from the Nordic countries and sanctioned by the ISU.

Nadia Margrét is also a certified Technical Specialist with the Icelandic Skating Association.

In 2019 she graduated from the medical department of the University of Iceland  with a Master's degree and works as a physical therapist. Her thesis Risk factors of overtraining and overuse injuries in children was based on her experience as a skater and coach in figure skating.

Career 
Nadia Margrét started skating at the age of 5 in San Diego. After moving to Iceland she trained at Skautafélag Reykjavíkur with Guillaume Kermen and also Svetlana Ahkmer and Nikolay Shashkov. During summers she attended skating camps in Sweden where she trained with Jennifer Molin and Thomas Öberg. She also skated with Patrice Paillares in Montpellier, France.

Early years as novice
Nadia Margrét debuted with the national team of Iceland at Nordic Championships 2007 as a novice after placing 3rd at Icelandic National Championships.

2010–2011 season 

This season was her junior debut and in November Nadia Margrét was one of four Icelandic skaters that were invited to participate in the Open Belgian Championships where she placed 8th. In December 2010 she became the Icelandic junior national champion. In April 2011 she was a part of the Icelandic national team at Coupe du Printemps in Luxembourg.

2011–2012 season 

Nadia Margrét earned a bronze at Icelandic junior nationals in December and went to Skate Malmö 2012 and placed 16th.

2012–2013 season 

In December 2012 she earned a bronze medal at Icelandic junior nationals. 
Year 2013 started with participation at Reykjavik International Games. Then she was again chosen for the national team, on home ground in Reykjavik, at The Nordics in 2013. In March she went with the national team for the second time to Coupe du Printemps.

2013–2014 season 

She skipped Icelandic nationals in December 2013 but debuted as a senior to earn a gold medal in at Reykjavik International Games in January 2014.

2014–2015 season 

Nadia Margrét became the senior national champion in December 2014 before having to retire due to persistent injuries.

Programs

Competitive highlights

Gallery

References

Citations

Sources

External links
Nordics 2013 article 
National championships 2014 article
Article RIG2014 on RÚV
Íslandsmót 2010 article

Icelandic female single skaters
American female single skaters
1994 births
Living people
Sportspeople from Reykjavík
Sportspeople from San Diego
American people of Icelandic descent
University of Iceland alumni